The Fighting Eagle is a 1927 American silent film adventure and romance drama starring Rod La Rocque. It was directed by Donald Crisp and it was produced by Cecil B. DeMille.  The film was set during the Napoleonic Era. The Fighting Eagle survives in several collections and has been released on DVD.

Cast
Rod La Rocque as Etienne Gerard
Phyllis Haver as Countess de Launay
Sam De Grasse as Talleyrand
Max Barwyn as Napoleon
Julia Faye as Josephine de Beauharnais
Sally Rand as Fraulein Hertz
Clarence Burton as Col. Neville
Alphonse Ethier as Major Oliver
Emile Drain as Napoleon
Carole Lombard

See also
 Brigadier Gerard (1915)
 The Adventures of Gerard (1970)

References

External links

1927 films
American silent feature films
Films directed by Donald Crisp
1927 adventure films
American adventure films
American black-and-white films
Films based on works by Arthur Conan Doyle
Films based on British novels
Napoleonic Wars films
Depictions of Napoleon on film
Cultural depictions of Joséphine de Beauharnais
Cultural depictions of Charles Maurice de Talleyrand-Périgord
1920s historical films
American historical films
1927 romantic drama films
American romantic drama films
American historical romance films
Pathé Exchange films
1920s American films
Silent romantic drama films
Silent adventure films
Silent American drama films